"We're Not Gonna Take It" is a song by the American band Twisted Sister from their album Stay Hungry. It was first released as a single (with "You Can't Stop Rock & Roll" as the B-side) on April 27, 1984. The Stay Hungry album was released two weeks later, on May 10, 1984. The single reached No. 21 on the Billboard Hot 100 singles chart, making it Twisted Sister's only Top 40 single. In addition, it is also the band's highest-selling single in the United States, having been certified Gold on June 3, 2009 for sales of over 500,000 units. The song was ranked No. 47 on 100 Greatest 80's Songs and No. 21 on VH1's 100 Greatest One Hit Wonders of the 80s. It also received criticism when the Parents Music Resource Center included the song on its "Filthy Fifteen" list for alleged violent lyrical content, allegations that were repudiated by lead singer Dee Snider.

Background
"We're Not Gonna Take It" was written by vocalist Dee Snider. As influences for the song, he cites the glam rock band Slade and the Christmas carol "O Come, All Ye Faithful". The end of the song uses lines from character Douglas C. Niedermeyer in the film Animal House (e.g., "You're all worthless and weak!"). Mark Metcalf, who played Niedermeyer, stars in the video.

Reception
Cash Box said the song has "glaring lead vocals, "sneering lyrics," "heavy metal skill and...a refreshing dose of humor."

Music video

The music video was directed by Marty Callner with an emphasis on slapstick comedy. The video begins with a disobedient son (played by Callner's son, Dax) playing Twisted Sister songs in his bedroom while the rest of the family is eating dinner. The father, "Douglas C." (played by Mark Metcalf as a character similar to his Douglas C. Niedermeyer from the 1978 film Animal House), goes to the boy's room and scolds him for being interested only in his guitar and Twisted Sister. At the end of the speech, he screams "What do you want to do with your life?", to which the son replies "I Wanna Rock!" He strums his guitar and the sound blasts the father out of a nearby window. The boy transforms into Dee Snider, and the music begins. Snider sings to the other children, who turn into the rest of the band, and they wreak havoc on the family. The father gets the worst of the band's mischief, as he repeatedly tries and fails to get back at the band members, getting knocked out of more windows and even a wall. Still, even after a series of the father’s failed retaliations, his wife happens by to awkwardly recover him, such as throwing a bucket of water onto him, dropping a first aid kit onto him, and even spraying his face with a hose.

Covers
The song has been covered by various artists including German pop punk band Donots in 2002 (which became a minor hit in Germany, reaching 33 in the Singles Chart). It was also covered by Bif Naked for the film Ready to Rumble which also became David Arquette's entrance theme while he appeared on WCW programing.

Ballad 

In 2016, Dee Snider gave magician Criss Angel the rights to use the song as an "anthem" for his HELP (Heal Every Life Possible) charity. "Dee and I have known each other since the 1990s and he was a strong proponent of mine for years. We are both from Long Island, or as we like to think of it, 'Strong Island,' and his record publishing company gave me the rights to the song and it is our anthem for gratis." Snider appeared in a video of a stripped down acoustic version for the charity, recorded in the desert outside Las Vegas and featuring children in hospital and a young woman shaving her head to symbolize fighting cancer.

Legacy
VH-1's series True Spin explains the song as simply an anthem of teen rebellion, but Snider appeared saying that he was happy that long after he is gone, "any time that the team is down by two, or somebody had a bad day at the office, they're gonna stand up and sing We're Not Gonna Take It".

Parodies
 American singer "Weird Al" Yankovic included a version of the song in his "Hooked on Polkas" medley from Dare to Be Stupid.
 American ska punk band Reel Big Fish used the melody to the song as part of their song "Everybody's Drunk" with lyrics altered to be: "We're all gonna get drunk! We're all gonna get drunk! Oh wait we're already drunk!"
 In 1999, the US rock band Lit parodied the opening scene in their video for "Zip-Lock".
 The song is popularly known as "Huevos con aceite" ("Eggs with oil") in Spanish-speaking countries. Twisted Sister has sung it as "Huevos con Aceite" when giving concerts in Spanish-speaking regions. In a Primavera commercial in Mexico, there was a parody named "Huevos con Aceite" with the lyrics: Huevos como siempre, oh no, ya no queremos, ahora con Primavera, desayunarán (Eggs as always, no. We don't want them. Now with Primavera butter, you'll take your breakfast).
 ApologetiX, an American Christian parody band, released the song "We're Not Going To Canaan" on their 2014 release Loaded 45's.
 Spanish heavy metal band Gigatrón released a version of this song with different Spanish lyrics titled "Heavy hasta la muerte", as a parody of being a true metal fan.

In politics
In 2012, Republican Vice-Presidential nominee Paul Ryan's campaign used the song in Mitt Romney's presidential campaign, until Snider asked Ryan not to play it anymore. Snider stated that he does not support Ryan and he planned on voting for Obama.

In the summer of 2015, the song was adopted as the theme song for Donald Trump's 2016 presidential campaign. The song was played after all his campaign appearances where it was known unofficially as the Trump fight song. Newsweek reported Snider gave Trump permission to use the song. Snider later changed his mind, saying that he had only allowed Trump to use the song because the two were friends, but then respectfully asked Trump to stop using it as he did not agree with many of Trump's stances. Snider did not want people to get the impression that he was endorsing Trump or his campaign.

During the 2018 teachers' strikes in the United States, the song was used as a rallying cry by teachers striking in Oklahoma and Arizona.

In Australia, Clive Palmer altered the lyrics to "Australia ain't gonna cop it" in a national TV campaign for United Australia Party ahead of the 2019 election. Twisted Sister condemned the unauthorized use of the song. Palmer disputed Twisted Sister's claim that they have any copyright over the portion of the song used in the advertisements, as he composed the lyrics and the melody was derived from "O Come, All Ye Faithful". In April 2021, Palmer was ordered by the Federal Court of Australia to pay $1.5 million in damages for copyright infringement. Palmer was also ordered to pay legal costs and to remove all copies of the song and accompanying videos off the internet.

On August 26, 2022, Snyder tweeted: "ATTENTION QANON, MAGAT FASCISTS: Every time you sing "We're Not Gonna Take It" remember it was written by a cross-dressing, libtard, tree hugging half-Jew who HATES everything you stand for. It was you and people like you that inspired every angry word of that song! SO F**K OFF!"

Use in advertising

 In 1985, non-profit United Way used snippets of the song and its music video to promote a program entitled "Changing the American Family". This was used as evidence during Snider's Senate hearing to indicate that the song was not violent or obscene, since United Way used "the video's introduction with the demanding father" as a "light-hearted way of talking about communication with teenagers".
A commercial for hotel chain Extended Stay America
 Commercials for the 2006 movie Charlotte's Web
 In 2009, Bridezillas used this song for their "family fights back" commercials. 
 TV spots for The SpongeBob Movie: Sponge Out of Water in 2015.
 2016 commercials for Veritas Technologies
 In a commercial for Comcast's Xfinity service, the song is parodied as "You're Not Gonna Watch It". At the end of the commercial, Snider is shown joking, "I used to like that song."
 2015 commercials for Ed Morse, a Florida automobile dealership
 A 2022 commercial of Discover Card.

Other uses
Supporters of J.League club Vegalta Sendai used the song melody for a chant to support the team, in which a video from November 2008 of fans at an away game against Yokohama FC cheering, was highlighted on Twisted Sister's website in the wake of the 2011 Great East Japan Earthquake.

With Snider's approval, the song was used by Ukrainians in protest of the 2022 invasion by Russia.

Dave Chappelle referenced the song in a bit for his popular comedy special, Dave Chappelle: Killin' Them Softly, in 2000.

Personnel 

 Dee Snider - lead vocals
 Eddie "Fingers" Ojeda - lead guitar, backing vocals
 Jay Jay French - rhythm guitar, backing vocals
 Mark "The Animal" Mendoza - bass, backing vocals
 A. J. Pero - drums, percussion

Charts

Weekly charts

Year-end charts

Certifications

References

Twisted Sister songs
1984 songs
1984 singles
Songs written by Dee Snider
Song recordings produced by Tom Werman
Music videos directed by Marty Callner
Protest songs
Atlantic Records singles
Obscenity controversies in music